The 2024 National Hockey League All-Star Game is an upcoming National Hockey League All-Star Game, scheduled to be held on February 3 at Scotiabank Arena in Toronto, Ontario, the home of the Toronto Maple Leafs.

History 
The NHL awarded Toronto as the host city of the game on February 4, 2023. This is the first time since 2012 in Ottawa that a Canadian city has been selected to host the game. This would be Toronto's 9th time hosting the NHL All-Star Game, including the first game in 1947. This would be the second time since the 2000 game that Scotiabank Arena (then known as Air Canada Centre) will host the game.

The NHL All-Star Skills Competition is scheduled for February 2.

Television
The All-Star Game and Skills Competition will be broadcast in the United States by ABC and ESPN, respectively. Both events will also stream live in the U.S. on ESPN+. In Canada, both the All-Star Game and Skills Competition will be broadcast in English on both CBC and Sportsnet, under the Hockey Night in Canada banner, and on TVA Sports in French. The All-Star Game will also stream live in Canada on Sportsnet Now.

References

National Hockey League All-Star Games
All-Star Game
NHL All-Star Game, 2024